The 1931–32 Buffalo Bulls men's basketball team represented the University of Buffalo during the 1932–33 NCAA college men's basketball season. The head coach was Art Powell, coaching his eighteenth season with the Bulls.

Schedule

|-

References

Buffalo Bulls men's basketball seasons
Buffalo
Buffalo Bulls
Buffalo Bulls